Marat-e Balkarun (also Romanized as Maratʿ-e Balkarūn) is a village in Sajjadrud Rural District, Bandpey-ye Sharqi District, Babol County, Mazandaran Province, Iran. At the 2006 census, its population was 114, in 30 families.

References 

Populated places in Babol County